A reserve currency (or anchor currency) is a foreign currency that is held in significant quantities by central banks or other monetary authorities as part of their foreign exchange reserves. The reserve currency can be used in international transactions, international investments and all aspects of the global economy. It is often considered a hard currency or safe-haven currency.

The United Kingdom's pound sterling was the primary reserve currency of much of the world in the 19th century and first half of the 20th century. However, by the middle of the 20th century, the United States dollar had become the world's dominant reserve currency. The world's need for dollars has allowed the United States government to borrow at lower costs, giving the United States an advantage in excess of US$100 billion per year.

History
Reserve currencies have come and gone with the evolution of the world’s geopolitical order. International currencies in the past have (excluding those discussed below) included the Greek drachma, coined in the fifth century B.C.E., the Roman denari, the Byzantine solidus and Islamic dinar of the middle-ages and the French franc.

The Venetian ducat and the Florentine florin became the gold-based currency of choice between Europe and the Arab world from the 13th to 16th centuries, since gold was easier than silver to mint in standard sizes and transport over long distances. It was the Spanish silver dollar, however, which created the first true global reserve currency recognized in Europe, Asia and the Americas from the 16th to 19th centuries due to abundant silver supplies from Spanish America.

While the Dutch guilder was a reserve currency of somewhat lesser scope, used between Europe and the territories of the Dutch colonial empire from the 17th to 18th centuries, it was also a silver standard currency fed with the output of Spanish-American mines flowing through the Spanish Netherlands. The Dutch, through the Amsterdam Wisselbank (the Bank of Amsterdam), were also the first to establish a reserve currency whose monetary unit was stabilized using practices familiar to modern central banking (as opposed to the Spanish dollar stabilized through American mine output and Spanish fiat) and which can be considered as the precursor to modern-day monetary policy.

It was therefore the Dutch which served as the model for bank money and reserve currencies stabilized by central banks, with the establishment of Bank of England in 1694 and the Bank of France in the 19th century. The British pound sterling, in particular, was poised to dislodge the Spanish dollar's hegemony as the rest of the world transitioned to the gold standard in the last quarter of the 19th century. At that point, the UK was the primary exporter of manufactured goods and services, and over 60% of world trade was invoiced in pounds sterling. British banks were also expanding overseas; London was the world centre for insurance and commodity markets and British capital was the leading source of foreign investment around the world; sterling soon became the standard currency used for international commercial transactions.

Attempts were made in the interwar period to restore the gold standard. The British Gold Standard Act reintroduced the gold bullion standard in 1925, followed by many other countries. This led to relative stability, followed by deflation, but because the onset of the Great Depression and other factors, global trade greatly declined and the gold standard fell. Speculative attacks on the pound forced Britain entirely off the gold standard in 1931.

After World War II, the international financial system was governed by a formal agreement, the Bretton Woods system. Under this system, the United States dollar (USD) was placed deliberately as the anchor of the system, with the US government guaranteeing other central banks that they could sell their US dollar reserves at a fixed rate for gold.

In the late 1960s and early 1970s, the system suffered setbacks ostensibly due to problems pointed out by the Triffin dilemma—the conflict of economic interests that arises between short-term domestic objectives and long-term international objectives when a national currency also serves as a world reserve currency.

Additionally, in 1971 President Richard Nixon suspended the convertibility of the USD to gold, thus creating a fully fiat global reserve currency system. However, gold has persisted as a significant reserve asset since the collapse of the classical gold standard.

Following the 2020 economic recession, the IMF opined about the emergence of "A New Bretton Woods Moment" which could imply the need for a new global reserve currency system. (see below: § Calls for an alternative reserve currency)

Global currency reserves
The IMF regularly publishes the aggregated Currency Composition of Foreign Exchange Reserves (COFER). The reserves of the individual reporting countries and institutions are confidential. Thus the following table is a limited view about the global currency reserves that only deals with allocated reserves:

Theory
Economists debate whether a single reserve currency will always dominate the global economy. Many have recently argued that one currency will almost always dominate due to network externalities (sometimes called "the network effect"), especially in the field of invoicing trade and denominating foreign debt securities, meaning that there are strong incentives to conform to the choice that dominates the marketplace. The argument is that, in the absence of sufficiently large shocks, a currency that dominates the marketplace will not lose much ground to challengers.

However, some economists, such as Barry Eichengreen, argue that this is not as true when it comes to the denomination of official reserves because the network externalities are not strong. As long as the currency's market is sufficiently liquid, the benefits of reserve diversification are strong, as it insures against large capital losses. The implication is that the world may well soon begin to move away from a financial system dominated uniquely by the US dollar. In the first half of the 20th century, multiple currencies did share the status as primary reserve currencies. Although the British Sterling was the largest currency, both the French franc and the German mark shared large portions of the market until the First World War, after which the mark was replaced by the dollar. Since the Second World War, the dollar has dominated official reserves, but this is likely a reflection of the unusual domination of the American economy during this period, as well as official discouragement of reserve status from the potential rivals, Germany and Japan.

The top reserve currency is generally selected by the banking community for the strength and stability of the economy in which it is used. Thus, as a currency becomes less stable, or its economy becomes less dominant, bankers may over time abandon it for a currency issued by a larger or more stable economy. This can take a relatively long time, as recognition is important in determining a reserve currency. For example, it took many years after the United States overtook the United Kingdom as the world's largest economy before the dollar overtook the pound sterling as the dominant global reserve currency. In 1944, when the US dollar was chosen as the world reference currency at Bretton Woods, it was only the second currency in global reserves.

The G8 also frequently issues public statements as to exchange rates. In the past due to the Plaza Accord, its predecessor bodies could directly manipulate rates to reverse large trade deficits.

Major reserve currencies

United States dollar

The United States dollar is the most widely held currency in the allocated reserves, representing about 61% of international foreign currency reserves, which makes it somewhat easier for the United States to run higher trade deficits with greatly postponed economic impact or even postponing a currency crisis. Central bank US dollar reserves, however, are small compared to private holdings of such debt. If non-United States holders of dollar-denominated assets decided to shift holdings to assets denominated in other currencies, then there could be serious consequences for the US economy. Changes of this kind are rare, and typically change takes place gradually over time, and markets involved adjust accordingly.

However, the US dollar remains the preferred reserve currency because of its stability along with assets such as United States Treasury security that have both scale and liquidity.

The US dollar's position in global reserves is often questioned because of the growing share of unallocated reserves, and because of the doubt regarding dollar stability in the long term. However, in the aftermath of the financial crisis, the dollar's share in the world's foreign-exchange trades rose slightly from 85% in 2010 to 87% in 2013.

The dollar's role as the undisputed reserve currency of the world allows the United States to impose unilateral sanctions against actions performed between other countries, for example the American fine against BNP Paribas for violations of U.S. sanctions that were not laws of France or the other countries involved in the transactions. In 2014 China and Russia signed a 150 billion yuan central bank liquidity swap line agreement to get around European and American sanctions on their behaviors.

Euro

The euro is currently the second most commonly held reserve currency, representing about 21% of international foreign currency reserves. After World War II and the rebuilding of the German economy, the German Deutsche Mark gained the status of the second most important reserve currency after the US dollar. When the euro was introduced on 1 January 1999, replacing the Mark, French franc and ten other European currencies, it inherited the status of a major reserve currency from the Mark. Since then, its contribution to official reserves has risen continually as banks seek to diversify their reserves, and trade in the eurozone continues to expand.

After the euro's share of global official foreign exchange reserves approached 25% as of year-end 2006 (vs 65% for the U.S. dollar; see table above), some experts have predicted that the euro could replace the dollar as the world's primary reserve currency. See Alan Greenspan, 2007;
and Frankel, Chinn (2006) who explained how it could happen by 2020.
However, as of 2022 none of this has come to fruition due to the European debt crisis which engulfed the PIIGS countries from 2009 to 2014. Instead the euro's stability and future existence was put into doubt, and its share of global reserves was cut to 19% by year-end 2015 (vs 66% for the USD). As of year-end 2020 these figures stand at 21% for EUR and 59% for USD.

Other reserve currencies

Dutch guilder
The Dutch guilder was the de facto reserve currency in Europe in 17th and 18th centuries.

Pound sterling
The United Kingdom's pound sterling was the primary reserve currency of much of the world in the 19th century and first half of the 20th century. That status ended when the UK almost bankrupted itself fighting World War I and World War II and its place was taken by the United States dollar.

In the 1950s, 55% of global reserves were still held in sterling; but the share was 10% lower within 20 years.

The establishment of the U.S. Federal Reserve System in 1913 and the economic vacuum following the World Wars facilitated the emergence of the United States as an economic superpower.

, the pound sterling represented the fourth largest proportion (by USD equivalent value) of foreign currency reserves and 4.78% of those reserves.

Japanese yen
Japan's yen is part of the International Monetary Fund's (IMF) special drawing rights (SDR) valuation. The SDR currency value is determined daily by the IMF, based on the exchange rates of the currencies making up the basket, as quoted at noon at the London market. The valuation basket is reviewed and adjusted every five years.

The SDR Values and yen conversion for government procurement are used by the Japan External Trade Organization for Japan's official procurement in international trade.

Swiss franc
The Swiss franc, despite gaining ground among the world's foreign-currency reserves and being often used in denominating foreign loans, cannot be considered as a world reserve currency, since the share of all foreign exchange reserves held in Swiss francs has historically been well below 0.5%. The daily trading market turnover of the franc, however, ranked fifth, or about 3.4%, among all currencies in a 2007 survey by the Bank for International Settlements.

Canadian dollar
A number of central banks (and commercial banks) keep Canadian dollars as a reserve currency. In the economy of the Americas, the Canadian dollar plays a similar role to that played by the Australian dollar (AUD) in the Asia-Pacific region. The Canadian dollar (as a regional reserve currency for banking) has been an important part of the British, French and Dutch Caribbean states' economies and finance systems since the 1950s. The Canadian dollar is also held by many central banks in Central America and South America. It is held in Latin America because of remittances and international trade in the region.

Because Canada's primary foreign-trade relationship is with the United States, Canadian consumers, economists, and many businesses primarily define and value the Canadian dollar in terms of the United States dollar. Thus, by observing how the Canadian dollar floats in terms of the US dollar, foreign-exchange economists can indirectly observe internal behaviours and patterns in the US economy that could not be seen by direct observation. Also, because it is considered a petrodollar, the Canadian dollar has only fully evolved into a global reserve currency since the 1970s, when it was floated against all other world currencies.

The Canadian dollar, from 2013 to 2017, was ranked fifth among foreign currency reserves in the world, overtaking Australian Dollar, but is then being overtaken by Chinese Yuan.

Calls for an alternative reserve currency
John Maynard Keynes proposed the bancor, a supranational currency to be used as unit of account in international trade, as reserve currency under the Bretton Woods Conference of 1945. The bancor was rejected in favor of the U.S. dollar.

A report released by the United Nations Conference on Trade and Development in 2010, called for abandoning the U.S. dollar as the single major reserve currency. The report states that the new reserve system should not be based on a single currency or even multiple national currencies but instead permit the emission of international liquidity to create a more stable global financial system.

Countries such as Russia and China, central banks, and economic analysts and groups, such as the Gulf Cooperation Council, have expressed a desire to see an independent new currency replace the dollar as the reserve currency. However, it is recognized that the US dollar remains the strongest reserve currency.

On 10 July 2009, Russian President Medvedev proposed a new 'World currency' at the G8 meeting in London as an alternative reserve currency to replace the dollar.

At the beginning of the 21st century, gold and crude oil were still priced in dollars, which helps export inflation and has brought complaints about OPEC's policies of managing oil quotas to maintain dollar price stability.

Special drawing rights
Some have proposed the use of the International Monetary Fund's (IMF) special drawing rights (SDRs) as a reserve. The value of SDRs are calculated from a basket determined by the IMF of key international currencies, which as of 2016 consisted of the United States dollar, euro, renminbi, yen, and pound sterling.

Ahead of a G20 summit in 2009, China distributed a paper that proposed using SDRs for clearing international payments and eventually as a reserve currency to replace the U.S. dollar.

On 3 September 2009, the United Nations Conference on Trade and Development (UNCTAD) issued a report calling for a new reserve currency based on the SDR, managed by a new global reserve bank. The IMF released a report in February 2011, stating that using SDRs "could help stabilize the global financial system."

Chinese yuan

Chinese yuan officially became a supplementary forex reserve asset on 1 October 2016. It represents 10.92% of the IMF's SDR currency basket. The Chinese yuan is the third reserve currency after the U.S. dollar and euro within the basket of currencies in the SDR. The SDR itself is only a minuscule fraction of global currency reserves.

Further reading 

 Ethan Ilzetzki, Carmen M Reinhart, Kenneth S Rogoff. 2019. "Exchange Arrangements Entering the 21st Century: Which Anchor Will Hold?" The Quarterly Journal of Economics.

See also 

 Bitcoin
 Commodity currency
 Cryptocurrency
 Exorbitant privilege
 Floating exchange rate
 Foreign exchange reserves
 Fiat money
 Hard currency
 Krugerrand
 Seigniorage
 Special drawing rights

References

Currency
Foreign exchange reserves
International finance
Monetary hegemony

fr:Réserves de change